Ho Man Tin is one of the 25 constituencies in the Kowloon City District of Hong Kong which was created in 1991.

The constituency has an estimated population of 19,625.

Councillors represented

1991–94

1994 to present

Election results

2010s

Notes

References

Ho Man Tin
Constituencies of Hong Kong
Constituencies of Kowloon City District Council
1991 establishments in Hong Kong
Constituencies established in 1991